László Böröcz (born in Szombathely, Hungary on November 11, 1983) is a Hungarian politician. He was a member of the National Assembly of Hungary (Országgyűlés). He has also served as the chairman of Fidelitas (Hungary) between 2015 and 2019. He was elected member of parliament in 2018. He lost the 2022 parliamentary election to Antal Csárdi in the Budapest 1st constituency.

References

See also 

 List of members of the National Assembly of Hungary (2018–2022)

Living people
1983 births
Hungarian politicians
21st-century Hungarian politicians
Fidesz politicians
Members of the National Assembly of Hungary (2018–2022)